Dollarama is a Canadian dollar store retail chain headquartered in Montreal. Since 2009 it is Canada's biggest retailer of items for five dollars or less. Dollarama has over 1400 stores and is active in all Canada; Ontario has the most stores.

History

Rossy S Inc.
The first all-dollar store was founded in Montreal in 1910 by Salim Rassy, a Lebanese immigrant, whose name became Rossy. His son George took over the retailer in 1937 and led the company until his death in 1973 when grandson Larry Rossy assumed leadership of it when it had 20 stores.

Dollarama 
The discount retailer  grew to 44 stores by 1992 which until then operated under the name Rossy S Inc. (not to be confused with Rossy Michael, a similar chain founded in 1949 by another son of Salim Rassy). That year, Larry Rossy opened the first Dollarama at the shopping centre "Les promenades du St-Laurent" in Matane. By the late 1990s, Dollarama had become by far the primary source of revenue for the Rossy family. As such, the Rossy S chain was discontinued by the turn of the new millennium, with all of its stores either closed or converted into Dollarama locations. After converting all the locations to the dollar store concept, Larry Rossy continued to open new stores reaching 1,000 stores in 2015. In November 2004, 80 percent of the chain was sold for $850 million US, to a private equity fund, Bain Capital, of Boston, Massachusetts.

Post IPO
Dollarama's initial public offering took place on October 9, 2009. In 2013, Dollarama was planning to expand its market to Latin America, and made an eight-year agreement to share its business expertise and offer sourcing services to Dollar City, a Salvadoran chain of dollar stores in Central America and Colombia.

In 2016, Dollarama established a partnership with the Marco G. R. Enterprise, resulting in the sponsorship of the first edition of the Formula Windsor Championship.

In 2018, Dollarama recalled over 50,000 children's toys due to dangerous levels of phthalates.

The number of stores in October 2021 was 539 in Ontario, 379 in Québec, 134 in Alberta, 111 in British Columbia, 42 in New Brunswick, 41 in Manitoba, 40 in Nova Scotia, 40 in Saskatchewan, 25 in Newfoundland and Labrador, and 5 in Prince Edward Island. The company announced that it would open 700 new locations across Canada (including a few replacements for some of the Great Canadian Dollar Store locations) in the aforementioned provinces as well as their first store in the Yukon Territory.

Business practices

Many items are priced at $1.00 or less, and initially almost all items were priced as such. In early 2009, Dollarama began to introduce items priced up to $2.00 (including $1.25 and $1.50 price points). Due to the positive response from consumers to the multi-price point strategy, the stores introduced items at $2.50 and $3.00 in August 2012. It again increased price points to include $3.50 and $4.00 items in August 2016. In 2022, Dollarama announced that its maximum price point would be increasing to $5.00. This price level increase allowed the chain to acquire products from a greater variety of sources, including closeout sales. Adjustments may eventually happen to all prices. Dollarama has always had a No Return and No Exchange Policy. Once an item is bought, it cannot be returned or exchanged.

Payment in Dollarama stores was once by cash only, until Interac debit cards were added as a payment option beginning in 2008. Gift cards began to be offered in 2011. As of 2015, all Dollarama stores also support contact-less Interac Flash payments. In March 2017, Dollarama announced that credit cards would be offered as a payment option at all stores by the end of summer 2018. Customers will be able to pay with Visa, Mastercard, and American Express, following a successful pilot program.

Many Dollarama stores were opened in place of former locations of the now defunct BiWay, which closed after a series of dubious financial transactions involving a new owner of the parent operation. Dollarama launched its online store on January 21, 2019 where it will sell many of its products in bulk. Only 1000 of the roughly 4000 products offered in Dollarama stores will be sold online, namely items that are easily purchased in bulk.

Most large scale modern dollar stores sourced products from their inception from China beginning in the mid-1990s when they appeared on the retail landscape. This was the same time when Chinese companies entered the market and were allowed to manufacture for Western countries. Dollarama started branding sourced products starting in the very early 2000s. Such brands include the store's line of stationery branded as Studio, and plastic storage containers under the name Plastico. For a long period of time the public did not know that these were created brands by Dollarama. This would only have been known if customers scrutinized the labels. Such practices were not new: private labels were created as a far back as the early 1930s in Canada by Canadian Tire with Motomaster products, and most retail stores followed.

An extremely large percentage of Dollarama products are privately sourced. In mid-2009 it rolled out its own store brand, "D". Unlike small dollar/discount stores, it sources most of its products directly from manufacturers, rather than from local unknown distributors.

See also
 A Buck or Two
 Dollar Tree
 Great Canadian Dollar Store
 Your Dollar Store with More

References

External links

 Official website
 CNW: Dollarama, press releases

Companies listed on the Toronto Stock Exchange
Franchises
Variety stores
Discount stores of Canada
Companies based in Montreal
Private equity portfolio companies
Bain Capital companies
S&P/TSX 60
Retail companies established in 1992
1992 establishments in Quebec
Canadian brands
Office supply companies of Canada